David S. Feldman is an American orthopedic surgeon, author, contributor to NIH, and Professor of Orthopedic Surgery and Pediatrics at NYU Langone. His work involves spinal deformities and complex conditions such as Arthrogryposis, skeletal dysplasia|, scoliosis, multiple hereditary exostoses, congenital pseudarthrosis of the tibia, hip dysplasia, and Legg–Calvé–Perthes disease as well as lower limb deformities and limb length discrepancies.

In 2015 Feldman joined the Paley Institute run by Dror Paley to lead the new Spine Deformity Center and Hip Pain Center.

Publications 
 Legg-Calvé-Perthes Disease —  Springer
 Accuracy of Correction of Tibia Vara: Acute Versus Gradual Correction — Journal of Pediatric Orthopaedics 2006
 A Predictive Risk Index for 30-day Readmissions Following Surgical Treatment of Pediatric Scoliosis — Journal of Pediatric Orthopaedics 2016
Anatomic Relationship of the Femoral Neurovascular Bundle in Patients With Congenital Femoral Deficiency — Journal of Pediatric Orthopaedics 2020

References 

American orthopedic surgeons
Living people
New York University faculty
Year of birth missing (living people)